A Finance Act is the fiscal legislation enacted by the Indian Parliament to give effect to the financial proposals of the Central Government. It is enacted once a year and contains provisions relating to income taxes, customs, excise, Central and Integrated GST and other cess, exemptions, and reliefs. It may also contain provisions to amend other acts as the Government to effect its fiscal policy. The bill is usually termed the budget and it is introduced in Parliament by the Finance Minister.

Important elements of Finance Act 
All the elements included in the Finance Act associated with a particular Financial Year are of course important. Even so, there are particular elements that take precedence over the others.

The most important element is the rules laid down in the Act with respect to Income Tax Rates. Every year, the Act lays down in detail all the associated provisions related to Income Tax in the country. Since this applies to a large number of taxpayers, it is considered one of the most important elements.

The Finance Act is responsible for laying down the tax slabs that applies to taxpayers. The Act includes various details related to:

 Income through Salary
 Agricultural Income
 Tax slabs for Senior Citizens
 Tax slabs for Very Senior Citizens
 Income Tax Surcharges
 Taxes chargeable to companies
 Advance tax

These are a few important elements included and elaborated upon in detail in the Finance Act for a particular year.

Direct Taxes 
The Finance Act for a particular financial year also includes the amendments that have been made with respect to Direct Taxes.

The Amendments made under various sections are noted down in this section of the Finance Act and each amendment of every section is noted down separately.

Also included in the Finance Act is the details of the insertion of new sections, if any.

The Schedule 
The Schedule in any Finance Act is a systematic depiction of all the rules and regulations laid down by the Act for that Financial Year.

The Schedule gives details on 
 Rates of Income Tax
 Surcharge on Income Tax
 Rates for Deduction of Tax at Source
 Details of Advance Tax 
 Details for computation of Net Agricultural Income

among other details.

Acts
The Taxation Laws (Second Amendment) Act, 2016 inserted the new Chapter IX A, as "Pradhan Mantri Garib Kalyan Yojana, 2016" in The Finance Act, 2016.

References

Indian tax legislation
Union budgets of India